Silovec is a settlement in the hills north of Brežice in eastern Slovenia. The area is part of the traditional region of Styria. It is now included in the Lower Sava Statistical Region.

A Late Bronze Age hoard was discovered by chance in Heathen Cave close to the settlement. It included bracelets, necklaces, sickles, and axes, all now kept by the museum in Brežice.

References

External links
Silovec on Geopedia

Populated places in the Municipality of Brežice